The 2018 EFL Trophy Final was a football match that took place on 8 April 2018 at Wembley Stadium, London. It was the final match of the 2017–18 EFL Trophy, the 34th edition of the EFL Trophy, a competition for the 48 clubs in EFL League One and EFL League Two, and 16 under-21 sides from Premier League and EFL Championship clubs. It was contested by Lincoln City, from League Two, and Shrewsbury Town, from League One. Lincoln City won the game 1–0, with the goal scored by Elliott Whitehouse. It was Lincoln's first cup win in any competition.

Route to the final
Note: In all results below, the score of the finalist is given first (H: home; A: away).

Match

Details

References

2018
Events at Wembley Stadium
Trophy Final
Efl Trophy Final 2018
Football League Trophy Final 2018
EFL Trophy Final